The Public Health Film Festival (PHFF) is a film festival organised by the Public Health Film Society (PHFS). The PHFF debuted in 2014, and takes place every two years. It specialises in screening films about health and is listed with the Internet Movie Database (IMDb).

The first three editions of the PHFF have been hosted by The Oxford Research Centre for the Humanities (TORCH) at the Radcliffe Humanities Department in Oxford, England.

The theme for the 1st edition of the PHFF was "Public Health Past, Present and Future"; the 2nd, in 2016, was "Health For All"; the 3rd, in 2018, was "Growing Up Well"; and the 4th, in 2020, was "Health and wellbeing in a pandemic: stories told through film".

The 2nd, 3rd and 4th editions of the PHFF have hosted screenings of winning films from the International Public Health Film Competition.

The 3rd edition of the PHFF saw the introduction of an Audience Award, which was won by the film Lucy: Breaking the Silence from Fact Not Fiction Films.

External links
Official Website

References

Film festivals in England